Bharti Dayal (born December, 1961 in Samastipur) is an Indian artist specialized in Madhubani art.

Biography 

Dayal was born in the Darbhanga district of North Bihar, the Mithila region famous for Madhubani painting. She obtained a bachelor's degree in Science and right after completed her master in Science (MSc).

Work 

From a young age, Dayal have been learning Madhubani painting from her mother and grandmother. She pursued the art form professionally from 1984, subsequent to completing her formal education in science. She has striven to bring innovation in the traditional art practiced in Mithila, and train other women artists from the region at her studio in New Delhi.

Her style is known for bringing a contemporary cast to traditional Madhubani art using modern media such as acrylic and canvas. She paints with natural, vegetable-based colors. Her renditions of Krishna and Radha depict undercurrents of "love, longing, and peace".

Exhibitions 

Dayal has held numerous exhibitions of her work nationally and internationally. Her Madhubani art was the subject of a documentary shown on French television in 1995. A show of her works in acrylic on canvas painted between June 2015 and June 2016 was organized by the Museum of Sacred Art (MOSA).

Dayal's seven Madhubani paintings, which are a combination of traditional art with contemporary modern subjects, are included in the book The New Bihar. Her illustration for the book's cover includes a girl riding a bicycle, symbolizing the "empowerment of women and the quest for education", and a fish, which denotes the theme of "rainbow agriculture", or the blending of agricultural pursuits to enhance rural income. Book authors N.K. Singh and Nicholas Stern have observed: "Bharti's use of the traditional style on contemporary themes can contribute to the revival of Madhubani art".

Awards 
 AIFACS
 Millennium award
 National Merit awards
 2006: India's National Award for excellence in handicrafts

Publications 

Cover art

Cover Art for 'Language Politics and Public sphere in North India .,Making of the Maithili Movement by Mithilesh kumar jha .publisher:Oxford university press ;

References

Bibliography

External links 
 

1961 births
Living people
Painters from Bihar
Indian women painters
Women artists from Bihar
People from Samastipur district
20th-century Indian women artists
21st-century Indian women artists
21st-century Indian artists